Four Corners Regional Airport  is in San Juan County, New Mexico, United States, in the city of Farmington, which owns it.  It is a Class D towered general aviation airport with no commercial passenger services, but has chartered flight services, flight instruction, and a full service fixed base operator (FBO).  It is included in the Federal Aviation Administration (FAA) National Plan of Integrated Airport Systems for 2019–2023, in which it is categorized as a regional general aviation facility.

The airport has free long-term passenger vehicle parking, a full service restaurant and one major car rental company at the terminal, and free WiFi in the terminal area.

Four Corners Regional Airport was served by many commercial air service providers, and was as high as the second busiest in the state of New Mexico, behind the Albuquerque International Sunport.  Today it is typically the fourth or fifth busiest airport in the state, usually behind Albuquerque International Sunport, Double Eagle II Airport (also in Albuquerque), Santa Fe Municipal Airport, Roswell International Air Center, and Lea County Regional Airport serving Hobbs. The decline in air service occurred when most regional airlines converted to jet aircraft, and the airport could not adequately adapt to accommodate them: the runways sit on top of a plateau which limited the lengths of the runways.  In recent years, construction has been underway to extend the plateau, widen and extend runways, and improve taxiways in an effort to eventually accommodate jet aircraft in accordance with FAA requirements.

Most commercial air service for the area now occurs at the La Plata County Airport near Durango, Colorado.

Historical airline service
Monarch Airlines was the first air carrier to serve Farmington beginning in 1947 using Douglas DC-3 aircraft on flights to Albuquerque and to Denver and Salt Lake City that made several stops en route. Monarch and two other carriers all merged in 1950 to create the original Frontier Airlines (1950-1986).

Frontier Airlines (1950-1986) continued to serve Farmington with DC-3s through the 1950s and added flights to Phoenix making several en-route stops as well. In 1958 Frontier created a mini-hub at Farmington operating 13 flights per day with as many as five DC-3 aircraft on the ground at one time. Through the 1960s Frontier upgraded their aircraft with Convair 340 piston engine aircraft and later with Convair 580 turboprops. By 1981, Frontier had discontinued all flights to Albuquerque, Phoenix, and Salt Lake City;  however, the flights to its Denver hub (with a fuel stop in Durango) were upgraded to Boeing 737-200 jetliners from 1982 through 1984. The Denver flights were then reverted to Convair 580 aircraft operated as Frontier Commuter before all service was discontinued in early 1985.

Aspen Airways first came to Farmington for a period in 1979 and flew Convair 580s nonstop to Denver and Albuquerque. The carrier returned to Farmington in 1983 with flights only to Denver and became a United Express affiliate in 1986. Aspen Airways introduced British Aerospace BAe 146-100 jets between Farmington and Denver with a stop in Durango beginning in 1985 but ended all flights in March 1990 when the carrier was sold to Mesa Airlines.

Mesa Airlines, founded in Farmington, began in 1980 with service to Albuquerque using small Piper prop aircraft. Beechcraft 99, Beechcraft 1300 and Beechcraft 1900 turboprops were introduced in the mid-1980s and new service to Phoenix was added in 1985. Nonstops to Salt Lake City were also briefly operated in 1988. Flights to Denver began in April 1990 when Mesa became a United Express affiliate after purchasing certain assets and routes of Aspen Airways. Larger Embraer EMB-120 Brasilia and de Havilland Canada DHC-8 Dash 8 propjets were then acquired. In 1992 Mesa began another affiliation with America West Airlines and the Phoenix flights began operating as America West Express. Flights to Las Vegas were also briefly added and operated as America West Express in the mid-1990s. By this time Mesa was the backbone air carrier at Farmington operating over 30 departures per day at times amongst their three divisions. Mesa's independent flights to Albuquerque operated every hour. The Denver flights were discontinued in 1998 when Mesa lost its United Express affiliation to Great Lakes Airlines. Independent flights operated by Mesa Air to Albuquerque ran through 2007 and the America West Express flights to Phoenix ended in mid-2008. America West Airlines merged with US Airways in late 2007 and the Phoenix flights then began operating as US Airways Express shortly before being discontinued. Mesa has since grown into a much larger air carrier and now operates an all regional jet fleet flying for several major airlines via respective code sharing agreements. The carrier has not served Farmington since 2008.

Trans-Colorado Airlines served Farmington from early 1986 through mid-1987 with flights to Denver and Albuquerque. The carrier became a Continental Express affiliate in mid-1986 and operated Convair 580 and Swearingen Metroliner propjets.

Rocky Mountain Airways served Farmington from mid-1990 through late 1991 also as Continental Express with flights to Denver. The carrier operated Beechcraft 1900 and ATR-42 aircraft.

American Eagle served Farmington from late 1994 through late 1995 with an eastbound flight to Lubbock and Dallas/Fort Worth and a westbound flight to Las Vegas and Los Angeles. Saab 340 and ATR-42 turboprop aircraft were used.

Great Lakes Airlines began serving Farmington in mid-1998 with Beechcraft 1900D flights to Denver. The carrier had received the United Express affiliation formerly held by Mesa Airlines. The United Express affiliation was discontinued in early 2002 but the carrier continued to operate under its own brand. New flights to Phoenix, Las Vegas, and Los Angeles were later added with one-stop en route however these flights all operated on a temporary basis. In late 2016, some flights were upgraded to larger, 30-seat, Embraer Brasilia aircraft however all flights ended on October 30, 2017, leaving Farmington with no commercial air service.

Other smaller commuter airlines that have served Farmington include:

 Zia Airlines from 1978 through 1980, with flights to Santa Fe and Albuquerque using Cessna 402 and Handley Page Jetstream aircraft.
 Sun West Airlines from 1980 through 1984, with flights to Albuquerque and Phoenix using Piper Navajo's and Beechcraft 99's.
 Air Midwest from 1982 through 1986, with flights to Albuquerque using Swearingen Metroliner's. Flights to Phoenix briefly operated in 1983.
 Pioneer Airlines, first in 1982 with flights to Denver, and again for a short period in the summer of 1983 with flights to both Albuquerque and Denver using Swearingen Metroliner and Beechcraft 99 aircraft.
 Rio Grande Air, which briefly served the Four Corners Airport from Albuquerque in 2001 with Cessna 208 Caravans.

The peak of Farmington's commercial air service occurred in the summer of 1983 when the city was served by six airlines simultaneously with a total of 38 departures per day, three of which were Frontier  Airlines Boeing 737 jets. As of October 30, 2017, there have been no commercial passenger flights at Farmington.

The airport has received a Small Community Air Service Development Program grant for SkyWest Airlines to begin service to Denver as United Express. The service was set to begin on October 15, 2020, but has been delayed due to the ongoing COVID-19 pandemic.

Facilities and aircraft

 Runway 5/23 – 6,501 x 150 ft (1,982 x 46 m)
 Runway 7/25 – 6,704 x 100 ft (2,043 x 30 m)

For the 12-month period ending December 31, 2021, the airport had 44,803 aircraft operations, an average of 122 per day: 84% general aviation, 13% air taxi and 3% military. For the period ending July 31, 2021, there were 87 aircraft based at this airport: 70 single-engine, 10 multi-engine, 1 jet, 4 helicopters, and 2 ultralights. The airport has one terminal for all arrivals and departures, as well as one FBO, Atlantic Aviation.

The data below lists annual total aircraft operations from the FAA's Air Traffic Activity System, 2009 through 2021.

External links
FAA Airport Data and Information Portal (ADIP) DIrectory Listing for FMN; includes official FAA Airport Diagram, approach and departure charts, and Form 5010 airport data
 hosted by the City of Farmington

References

Airports in New Mexico
Farmington, New Mexico
Buildings and structures in San Juan County, New Mexico
Transportation in San Juan County, New Mexico